Ajit Pal Tyagi is an Indian politician, lawyer, businessperson, and member of the Bharatiya Janata Party, the largest political party in India. He is a member of the 18th Legislative Assembly of Uttar Pradesh, representing the Muradnagar Assembly constituency of Uttar Pradesh.

Early life

Ajit Pal Tyagi was born on 1 July 1973 in Ghaziabad, Uttar Pradesh, India, to a Hindu family of Rajpal Tyagi. He completed his graduation in Bachelor of Laws at Mahatma Jyotiba Phule Rohilkhand University, Bareilly, Uttar Pradesh, India.

Posts held

See also 
 18th Uttar Pradesh Assembly
 Muradnagar Assembly constituency
 Uttar Pradesh Legislative Assembly

References 

1973 births
Living people
People from Uttar Pradesh
Indian political people
Uttar Pradesh MLAs 2022–2027
Indian politicians